Robert C. Carroll is an American politician and attorney. He is a Democratic member of the New York State Assembly, representing the 44th District. The district includes portions of the neighborhoods of Park Slope, Windsor Terrace, Kensington, Borough Park, Victorian Flatbush, Ditmas Park, and Midwood.

Early life and education 
Carroll is a lifelong resident of Brooklyn and was raised in the Windsor Terrace and Kensington neighborhoods, where he still resides. He attended Xaverian High School before graduating from Binghamton University and New York Law School.

Career
Carroll was a practicing attorney at a firm in Manhattan and the Development Director of a non-profit theatrical organization.

Carroll became the youngest president of the Central Brooklyn Independent Democrats. He also served as a member of Brooklyn Community Board 7.

New York State Assembly
Retiring Assemblyman James F. Brennan stepped down in 2016, creating the first vacancy in 32 years.

Carroll easily secured the Democratic nomination. He also won the nomination of the Working Families Party.

Carroll is the Chair of the Subcommittee on Museums and Cultural Institutions.

Carroll has written and co-sponsored several bills designed to help children with Dyslexia. In 2020, Carroll wrote a bill that would enforce tests in schools that would help to screen young students for Dyslexia. The Yale Center for Dyslexia and Creativity praised Carroll and the bill, calling the bill “Groundbreaking news for all who care about Dyslexia and the future of children who are Dyslexic.”

In 2019 Carroll worked with the Brooklyn Irish LGBTQ+ Organization (BILO) and the Irish American Parade Committee to allow for BILO to walk in the Brooklyn St. Patrick’s Day Parade. This marked the first time an openly LGBTQ+ organization marched in the parade. Carroll’s grandfather co-founded the parade in 1976. On the committee’s decision, Carroll stated, “I am so glad that everyone was able to come together to honor Irish heritage and culture and make this the first fully inclusive St. Patrick’s Day parade in Brooklyn.”

Election results

References

External links
New York State Assemblyman Robert C. Carroll official site
Robert C. Carroll Twitter

Living people
Democratic Party members of the New York State Assembly
People from Kensington, Brooklyn
21st-century American politicians
Binghamton University alumni
New York Law School alumni
American people of Irish descent
1986 births